Buginbaatar is an extinct genus of mammal from the Upper Cretaceous of Mongolia. It is a member of the extinct order Multituberculata, within the suborder Cimolodonta and family Cimolomyidae. It lived towards the end of the Mesozoic era.

The genus Buginbaatar was named by Kielan-Jaworowska Z. and Sochava A.V. in 1969 based on the remains of a single species. Remains of this species, dubbed Buginbaatar clarki, were found in Upper Cretaceous strata of Bügiyn Tsav in Mongolia.
   
This is the only known Upper Cretaceous Mongolian multituberculate not to belong to the family Djadochtatherioidea. Remains are incomplete and the assignment of B. to the Cimolomyidae is tentative, (Kielan-Jaworowska & Hurum 2001, p. 408).

References
 Kielan-Jaworowska & Sochava (1969), "The first multituberculate from the uppermost Cretaceous of the Gobi Desert (Mongolia)". Acta Palaeontologica Polonica 14, p. 355-371.
 Kielan-Jaworowska Z & Hurum JH (2001), "Phylogeny and Systematics of multituberculate mammals". Paleontology 44, p. 389-429.
 Much of this information has been derived from  MESOZOIC MAMMALS: "basal" Cimolodonta, Cimolomyidae, Boffiidae and Kogaionidae, an Internet directory.

Cimolodonts
Cretaceous mammals of Asia
Maastrichtian life
Nemegt fauna
Fossil taxa described in 1969
Taxa named by Zofia Kielan-Jaworowska
Prehistoric mammal genera